Lake Maraetai is one of several artificial lakes formed as part of a hydroelectricity scheme on the Waikato River in the North Island of New Zealand.

References

External links
 Mighty River Power's Maraetai page

Lakes of Waikato